An Adequate Public Facilities Ordinance (APFO, also known as a Concurrency Regulation) is an American legislative method to tie public infrastructure to growth for a region.

APFOs take into account the availability of infrastructure. They can manage growth, but are considered separate from growth controls such as building moratoria.

History 

Ramapo, New York (see Golden v. Planning Board of Ramapo); Petaluma, California; and Boulder, Colorado were some of the early adopters of this tool in America. The state of Florida uses the term "concurrency" in its growth management act.

Scope
APFO regulations are typically applied to a jurisdiction which has legislative control of a given area. In America, this can be at a state, county, or city level. A conflict can occur when APFO regulations differ in scope between jurisdictions where there is shared funding and legislative authority (such as a city located inside a county that funds schools). While APFOs are intended to mitigate infrastructure shortcomings for a particular area, the mitigation may apply to areas offsite of the development project. APFO regulations usually apply to individual projects on a case-by-case basis.

APFO regulations take into account some or all of a jurisdiction's infrastructure requirements, including:
Transportation
School facilities
Water supply
Water treatment
Roads

Other elements include:
CIP – Capitol Improvement Programs
Service Level Standards

Criticism
Traditional opponents of APFO legislation include industries affected by moratoria or fees, including realtors, developers, and some Smart Growth advocates. Home costs for some locations that have enacted APFO have experienced increases in housing prices affecting affordable housing, in conjunction with positive effects of relief from school capacity shortcomings.

See also

 Ecistics
 Activity centre
 Context theory
 Exclusionary zoning
 Form-based codes
 Inclusionary zoning
 Mixed use development
 New urbanism
 Non-conforming use
 Planning permission
 Principles of Intelligent Urbanism
 Reverse sensitivity
 Spot zoning
 Statutory planning
 NIMBY

References

External links
An example of a Florida APFO regulation
Dolan v. City of Tigard – property rights

Real estate in the United States
Real property law
 
Urban planning